Sofia Drake of Torp and Hamra (1662-16 September 1741), was a Swedish landowner. She is known for her correspondence with her spouse, Lieutenant Colonel Jon Stålhammar, during his absence in the Great Northern War, and as the Frun på Salshult (The lady of Salshult) in the 1886 poem by Carl Snoilsky of the same name.

Life
Sofia Drake was born to Colonel Johan Christersson Drake of Torp and Hamra and Margareta Klingspor. She married Lieutenant Colonel Jon Stålhammar (1659-1708) in 1689, and became the mother of seven children. As was the custom in Sweden until the late 18th-century, she kept her birth name after marriage. Their families both belonged to the lesser nobility, but were well off. 

In 1700, her spouse was called away to serve in the Great Northern War: except for a brief meeting in 1702, they were never to see each other again. Their correspondence is famous in Swedish history. Judging from their correspondence, their marriage did not seem to be an arranged marriage of the time. On one occasion, her spouse assures her that he is faithful, apparently after she had expressed concern for it. During the absence of her husband, Drake was given the responsibility of the family affairs, children and household and the estate Salshult. She is described as a respected, forceful and effective business person, who did not only managed the estate successfully, but also expanded it. She continued in this role after having been widowed in 1708: her eldest son died in war service in 1711, when her remaining son was not yet an adult. 

In 1726, Sofia Drake, as a family matriarch, gave refuge to her niece Ulrika Eleonora Stålhammar, who asked for her help after she was exposed as a woman while serving in the Army. She had also married a woman posing as a man, which was a serious crime in contemporary law. Drake arranged for Stålhammar to be sent to her son's widowed mother-in-law in Värmland, to adjust to wearing women's clothes and then apply for leniency. Drake made a "powerful intervention" on her behalf, which is estimated to have contributed to her light sentence in 1729, after which Drake gave Maria Lönman, the wife of Stålhammar, employment as a housekeeper at Salshult, and Ulrika Eleonora herself sent back to Värmland. Her eldest son and heir Otto Fredrik Stålhammar settled with his family at Salshult in 1732, by which time she would have renounced the management of the estate to him. She had her own household on Salshult, but in 1738, the management of her affairs were taken over by her children, possibly because of her declining health.

References
 
Larsson, Lars-Olof, På marsch mot evigheten - Svensk stormaktstid i släkten Stålhammars spegel (2007)
Karolinska kvinnoöden av Alf Åberg. Natur & Kultur

1662 births
1741 deaths
Swedish people of the Great Northern War
18th-century Swedish businesspeople
17th-century Swedish landowners
18th-century Swedish landowners
17th-century women landowners
18th-century women landowners